Sam Sommers (born September 17, 1939) is a former American stock car racing driver from Savannah, Georgia. Sommers competed in 30 NASCAR Winston Cup races between 1976 and 1978, where he achieved a total of 9 top ten finishes and 1 pole position. In 2016, Sommers was inducted into the Georgia Racing Hall of Fame.

Motorsports career results

NASCAR
(key) (Bold – Pole position awarded by qualifying time. Italics – Pole position earned by points standings or practice time. * – Most laps led.)

Winston Cup Series

Daytona 500

References

External links
 

1939 births
Sportspeople from Savannah, Georgia
NASCAR drivers
Living people